Richard Meloan Duncan (November 10, 1889 – August 1, 1974) was a United States representative from Missouri and a United States district judge of the United States District Court for the Eastern District of Missouri and the United States District Court for the Western District of Missouri.

Education and career

Born in St. Joseph, Missouri, near Edgerton, Missouri, Duncan attended the public schools. He graduated from Christian Brothers College, in St. Joseph, in 1909. He was a deputy circuit clerk of Buchanan County, Missouri from 1911 to 1917, and read law to be admitted to the bar in 1916, entering private practice in St. Joseph from 1917 to 1926. He was city counselor to the city of St. Joseph from 1926 to 1930.

Congressional service

Duncan served as delegate to the 1932 Democratic National Convention. He was elected as a Democrat to the United States House of Representatives of the 73rd United States Congress and to the four succeeding Congresses, serving from March 4, 1933 to January 3, 1943. He served as Chairman of the Democratic Caucus for the 77th United States Congress, but was unsuccessful in his candidacy for reelection in 1942 to the 78th United States Congress.

Federal judicial service

On July 8, 1943, Duncan was nominated by President Franklin D. Roosevelt to a new joint seat on the United States District Court for the Eastern District of Missouri and the United States District Court for the Western District of Missouri created by 56 Stat. 1083. He was confirmed by the United States Senate on July 8, 1943, and received his commission on July 14, 1943. He served as Chief Judge of the Western District from 1954 to 1959, assuming senior status on May 31, 1965, and serving in that capacity until his death on August 1, 1974, in Kansas City, Missouri, where he resided. He was interred in Memorial Park Cemetery in St. Joseph.

References

Sources

 

1889 births
1974 deaths
Judges of the United States District Court for the Eastern District of Missouri
Judges of the United States District Court for the Western District of Missouri
United States district court judges appointed by Franklin D. Roosevelt
20th-century American judges
Democratic Party members of the United States House of Representatives from Missouri
United States federal judges admitted to the practice of law by reading law